Rajpara is a thana of Rajshahi District in the division of Rajshahi, Bangladesh.

Geography
It has 15 households and total area 25 km2.

Demographics
According to the 2011 Bangladesh census, Rajpara had a population of 137,318 (males 51.23%, females 48.77). Muslims were 93.68% of the population, Hindus 4.50%, Christians 0.97% and others 0.85%. Rajpara had a literacy rate of 73.92% for the population 7 years and above.

In 2001, Rajpara had an average literacy rate of 69.70% (7+ years) compared with the national average of 32.4%.

Administration
Rajpara has 10 unions/wards and 46 mauzas/mahallas.

Education

Secondary schools
There are 28 secondary schools in the thana. They include:
 Balajan Nessa Girls High School
 Court Model High School
 Golzar Bag High School
 Government Laboratory High School Rajshahi
 Laxmipur Girls High School
 Mahish Bathan Adarsha Uchcha Balika Bhiddyalay
 Mission Girls High School
 Rajshahi Court Academy
 Rajshahi Government Girls' High School
 Rajshahi Government Madrasha
 Rajshahi Medical College Campus High School
 River View Collectorate School Rajshahi
 Shimul Memorial North South School

See also
 Upazilas of Bangladesh
 Districts of Bangladesh
 Divisions of Bangladesh

References

Thanas of Rajshahi District